Ubiratan Brandao de Souza (born 1 November 1995) is a Brazilian professional footballer who plays as a left winger, currently at Grêmio Prudente

Career statistics

Club

Honours
Velež Mostar
Bosnian Cup: 2021–22
First League of FBiH: 2018–19

References

External links
Brandao de Souza at Sofascore

1995 births
Living people
Sportspeople from Salvador, Bahia
Brazilian footballers
Brazilian expatriate footballers
Brazilian expatriate sportspeople in Bosnia and Herzegovina
Expatriate footballers in Bosnia and Herzegovina
Association football wingers
First League of the Federation of Bosnia and Herzegovina players
Premier League of Bosnia and Herzegovina players
FK Velež Mostar players